Polyvinyl is a group of polymers derived from vinyl monomers.

Polyvinyl may also refer to:

 Polyvinyl chloride
 Polyvinyl acetate
 Polyvinyl alcohol
 Polyvinyl Record Co., an independent record label